Grief was an American sludge metal band based in Boston, Massachusetts.

Biography
Grief was founded in 1991 by Disrupt guitarist Terry Savastano and Unleashed Anger drummer Pete Donovan. Randy Odierno (who later switched to bass and later again left to join Bane of Existence) and Jeff Hayward joined shortly thereafter. They disbanded in 2001 mainly due to drummer problems - something that was an ongoing problem for the band from the start. They also cited what they called a "hostile environment for doom metal bands". They reunited briefly in July 2005 to play a cluster of reunion shows.

The band had several 7"s including one with Dystopia and Corrupted each. A compilation album called Turbulent Times appeared in 2002 through Southern Lord. The group reunited for one show at the first annual New England Grind And Doom Fest on July 17, 2005 at The Middle East Cafe in Cambridge, MA. They were so excited by the response to this show that they began booking others, and they toured intermittently throughout 2005 and 2006.

In 2005, the band played shows through in venues including The Ace of Clubs and The Knitting Factory in New York, The Khyber in Philadelphia, O'Brien's in Allston/Brighton, MA, The Living Room in Providence, RI, and Cherry St. Station in CT.

In 2006, Southern Lord Records released a full-length live album called Alive which featured their performance at the Middle East in November 2005.

Grief's final appearance was at Emissions from the Monolith 8, a sludge/doom festival that took place in Ohio, May 2006.

The Hartford Advocate wrote the following about their December 3, 2005 date at Cherry St. Station in CT:

Since 1991, these Massholes have been writing songs about a distinctly New England flavor of depression and isolation. Jeff Hayward's throat-shredding vocals often seem more hardcore than metal; indeed, almost 15 years later, it's possible to see Grief as one of a handful of seminal NE bands who initiated the merger between hardcore and metal. However, unlike some of those bands, Grief still sounds both relevant and entertaining.

The band re-formed in 2008 and toured the United States and Europe, but they soon disbanded again in March 2009.

In 2012, Savastano formed the idea of reuniting Grief as Come to Grief, after the seminal 1994 album. Their name was changed in 2014 and followed by a headlining appearance in Oakland, California's Deadfest 2015.

Members of the band have gone on to play in many other bands since the dissolution of Grief including Consume, Deathraid, Disrupt, State of Fear, Unleashed Anger, Goff, Demonic Death Preachers, Effects of Alcohol, Noosebomb, Abhorred, Z28, and Chicken Chest and the Bird Boys.

Members 
Jeff Hayward - vocals, guitar
John Heidenrich -  guitar, vocals
Eric C. Harrison - bass, vocals, artwork
Ray McCaffrey - drums, percussion

Discography

Studio albums

Split singles

Compilation and live albums
2002: Turbulent Times (Southern Lord Records)
2006: Alive (Southern Lord Records)
2008: Euro Tour (Alerta Antifascista)

References

External links
Official website
Eric Harrison's Marsh Paw Press - books of Art and Writing
Grief at Southernlord.com

American doom metal musical groups
American sludge metal musical groups
Musical groups from Boston
Heavy metal musical groups from Massachusetts
Musical groups established in 1991
Musical groups disestablished in 2001
Musical quartets
1991 establishments in Massachusetts